(),  or  (these last two are words of African origin) is a Brazilian sweet dish, associated with winter festivals, which in Brazil is in June (Festa Junina).

The dish is a porridge made with white or yellow de-germed whole maize kernels, cooked with milk, sugar and cinnamon until tender. Coconut and coconut milk as well as some cloves and roasted peanuts are also added, mainly in the northern variety of this recipe (Northeastern variety). Other ingredients may be added, such as peanuts and sweetened condensed milk.

The name  is prevalent in central-southern Brazil, while  is used in the northern states (where  means a different dish, made with unripe cooked corn juice). Both words come from the Kikongo and/or Kimbundu languages, where they refer to similar grain porridges.

See also 
 Pamonha
 Canjica, a type of white corn
 Curau
 List of Brazilian sweets and desserts
 Cuisine of São Tomé and Príncipe

References

External links 
 Canjica recipe from a site in Portuguese.

Brazilian desserts
Milk dishes
Foods containing coconut
Porridges